Southeastern Free Will Baptist College is a college of the Free Will Baptist denomination located in Wendell, North Carolina.  It was started in Virginia Beach, Virginia at Gateway FWB Church.  Jim Marcum took over as President of the college in 2012, replacing Dr. Lorenza Stox. Jeff Jones is Chairman of the Board of Directors. According to the college's website, "The purpose of Southeastern Free Will Baptist College is to train young men and women for church-related ministries." In 2018 Nate Ange took over as President, replacing Jim Marcum.

Degrees and certificates

Southeastern offers bachelor's degrees in Teacher Education, Religious Arts, Missions, and Bible.  A two-year Associate in Ministry is also available. This school is accredited through the Transnational Association of Christian Colleges and Schools.

Student information

The college has a student base from Free Will Baptist and Baptist churches across the country. Approximate cost of this college is $15,900 per year including tuition, room and board, and fees.

References

External links
 Southeastern Free Will Baptist College

Bible colleges
Educational institutions established in 1983
Free Will Baptist schools
Unaccredited Christian universities and colleges in the United States
Universities and colleges in the Research Triangle
Universities and colleges in Wake County, North Carolina
1983 establishments in North Carolina
Seminaries and theological colleges in North Carolina